Zbarazh Raion was a subdivision known as a raion, of Ternopil Oblast of Ukraine. The administrative center was the city of Zbarazh. The raion was abolished on 18 July 2020 as part of the administrative reform of Ukraine, which reduced the number of raions of Ternopil Oblast to three. The area of Zbarazh Raion was split between Kremenets Raion and Ternopil Raion. The last estimate of the raion population was

Subdivisions
At the time of disestablishment, the raion consisted of two hromadas:
 Vyshnivets settlement hromada with the administration in the urban-type settlement of Vyshnivets, transferred to Kremenets Raion;
 Zbarazh urban hromada with the administration in Zbarazh, transferred to Ternopil Raion.

Demographics
The population in 2001 was 60,349, a decline of 5% from 63,600 in 1989.

Average life expectancy is 71.
The urban population was 28%.

Geography
Zbarazh Raion had an area of

Neighboring raions
Zboriv (west), Kremenetsi (north), Shumsk (northeast), Lanivtsi (east), Pidvolochysk (southeast), Ternopil (southwest)

References

Former raions of Ternopil Oblast
1939 establishments in Ukraine
Ukrainian raions abolished during the 2020 administrative reform